Sixteen Stone is the debut studio album by English rock band Bush, released on 6 December 1994 by Trauma and Interscope Records. It became the band's most popular album, peaking at number four on the US Billboard 200 and boasting numerous successful singles. "Comedown" and "Glycerine" remain two of Bush's biggest hits to date, each reaching number one on the US Billboard Modern Rock Tracks chart. "Comedown", "Machinehead", and "Glycerine" were the three songs from the album to enter the US Billboard Hot 100, reaching number thirty, number forty-three, and number twenty-eight, respectively. The album was certified 6× Platinum in the United States by the RIAA on 16 April 1997.

To mark its twentieth anniversary, a remastered edition of the album was released on 14 October 2014.

Recording and background 
Sixteen Stone was recorded in January 1994 at Westway Records in London, and produced by Clive Langer and Alan Winstanley. In 1999, Gavin Rossdale explained that the decision to have Langer produce the record was brought about by Langer simply being English, and by his work co-writing the song "Shipbuilding" with Elvis Costello. Rossdale initially wanted Steve Albini, who produced the 1996 follow-up Razorblade Suitcase, to work on Sixteen Stone. David Carson designed the album artwork and packaging for the album.

Guitarist Nigel Pulsford's father and Rossdale's stepfather died around the time the album was recorded. Sixteen Stone is dedicated to both.

Some time prior to release, the band, known previously as Future Primitive, became known as Bush after Carson convinced the band that a shortened name would be more suitable for a CD. Sixteen Stone was delivered to Trauma Records in early April 1994, and released on 6 December that year through the label. Rossdale has stated that the reason Sixteen Stones release through Trauma was delayed was the label's distributor, Hollywood Records, opining that the record contained "no singles" and "no album tracks".

 Content 
 Style and influences 
The music of Sixteen Stone has been characterized variously as grunge, hard rock, and post-grunge, and has been compared with the music of 90s Seattle-based bands including Nirvana, Pearl Jam, Alice in Chains and Soundgarden; the song "Bomb" in particular invited a description of "Nirvana-approximating" from Stereogum. Styles displayed on the record include the balladry of "Glycerine", the Ramones-indebted punk rock of "X-Girlfriend", and what Stereogum proclaimed as "groove-grunge" on "Comedown" and "Body".

Drummer Robin Goodridge told the publication Modern Drummer in 1996 that Sixteen Stone features percussion informed by the styles John Bonham of Led Zeppelin, Billy Cobham and Keith Moon of The Who.

 Lyrics 
The lyrical content of Sixteen Stone revolved around a variety of themes. "Testosterone" conveyed a take-down of machismo, while  Stereogum analyzed "Monkey" to be a "sardonic statement about rock stardom" and to "attack the British sellout angle". "Bomb" is an anti-war song; Rossdale told American Songwriter in 2011 that the song had been "written about the Irish IRA presence where I grew up". Other songs related to personal challenges, including "Little Things" which Rossdale claimed was written about "trying to be strong in the face of adversity".

Reception
 Critical reception 

Sixteen Stone received mostly positive feedback from music critics. Q wrote that Bush "make a carefully honed post-grunge sound that fits perfectly alongside American counterparts like Stone Temple Pilots or Live." In a four-and-a-half stars out of five review, Stephen Thomas Erlewine of AllMusic calls their sound impressive, but states that the band sounds too much like Seattle rockers Nirvana and Pearl Jam. Robert Christgau was more critical in The Village Voice, regarding it as a "not altogether unmusical howl of male pain" that glorified "despair".

 Accolades 
In April 2014, Rolling Stone placed the album at number thirty-nine on their 1994: The 40 Best Records From Mainstream Alternative's Greatest Year list. A month later, Loudwire placed Sixteen Stone at number eight on its "10 Best Hard Rock Albums of 1994" list. In July 2014 Guitar World placed the album on its "Superunknown: 50 Iconic Albums That Defined 1994" list.

 Remaster 
Around the album's 20th anniversary, a remastered edition of its original recordings was released. When asked about also remixing the album for the anniversary edition, Rossdale stated "I did attempt to remix ... but it's really, like, you just can't do that. You can't mess with stuff. Those mixes, every single level of those songs is just ingrained in my DNA as it's probably in anybody's DNA who knows it. It just sounds really weird when you mess with it."

Track listingNotesEarly pressings of the album do not list "Alien" on the back cover (there is a blank space where the title should be). "Monkey" is also missing from the inside cover, but both songs have lyrics printed and appear on the album.
Subsequent pressings also include an acoustic version of "Comedown" and a second CD of live tracks, "Swim", "Alien", "Bomb", and "Little Things". Rather than actually being acoustic, the bonus "Comedown" track is actually Rossdale singing and playing guitar with more effects. This version is also slower-paced, has violins added and has no drums.

PersonnelBushGavin Rossdale – lead vocals, rhythm guitar
Nigel Pulsford – lead guitar, backing vocals
Dave Parsons – bass
Robin Goodridge – drumsAdditional musiciansCaroline Dale – cello
Gavyn Wright – violin, viola
Vincas Bundza – harmonica
Jasmine Lewis – backing vocals
Alessandro Vittorio Tateo – backing vocals
Winston – backing vocalsTechnical personnel'''
Bush – producer, engineer
Clive Langer – producer, engineer, mixing
David J. Holman – mixing
Paul Palmer – mixing
Danton Supple – assistant engineer
Robert Vosgien – mastering
Alan Winstanley – producer, engineer, mixing
Debra Burley – co-ordination
Jackie Holland – co-ordination
Paul Cohen – photography, cover photo
Mark Lebon – photography
Gillian Spitchuk – paintings
Mixed at Cactus Studio Hollywood

Chart performanceSixteen Stone first entered the Billboard'' 200 at number 187 for week ending 28 January 1995, and eventually peaked at number four. In 2010 the album's US sales passed the six million mark.

Weekly charts

Year-end charts

Decade-end charts

Certifications

References

Bibliography

Bush (British band) albums
Trauma Records albums
1994 debut albums
Albums produced by Clive Langer
Albums produced by Alan Winstanley